The Piedrancha Fault is a dextral oblique strike-slip fault in the department of Nariño in southwestern Colombia.

Etymology 
The fault is named after Piedrancha, the original name for the municipality Mallama in Nariño.

Description 
The Piedrancha Fault is in the Nariño Department of southwestern Colombia, on the western slope of the Western Ranges of the Colombian Andes and to the west of the city of Pasto. The fault places Cretaceous oceanic rocks on the west against Cenozoic volcanic rocks on the east. The fault is believed to extend south into the Republic of Ecuador.

See also 

 List of earthquakes in Colombia
 Guáitara Fault
 Romeral Fault System

References

Bibliography

Maps 
 

Seismic faults of Colombia
Strike-slip faults
Thrust faults
Inactive faults
Faults